Sternschanze is a rapid transit station for the trains of Hamburg S-Bahn lines S11, S21 and S31 and Hamburg U-Bahn line U3. The railway station is located in the quarter Sternschanze in the Hamburg borough of Altona, Germany. North of the railway station is a bus stop for the terminating HHA bus route 181.

History 
That station was at grade, with a number of level crossings at nearby streets. On  a new, elevated station was built, including a massive station hall. During the 1970s, the S-Bahn's station hall was dismantled.

Station layout 
Sternschanze is a small cul-de-sac between station to the south and Sternschanzenpark to the north. The western, main entrance for the S-Bahn platform is located at the intersection of Sternschanze and Schanzenstraße. A common entrance for U-Bahn and S-Bahn is located at the S-Bahn's eastern entrance, some  further down Sternschanze.

The island platform and tracks for the S-Bahn are elevated on a rail dam, along with tracks for regional and long distance trains that run past the station south of it. The S-Bahn platform is handicap-accessible through a lift. The station is unstaffed, but there are emergency and information telephones, ticket machines and a shop.

The underground platform of the U3 is situated at the east side of the railway station and has only one entrance at the platform's southern end. The underground station is not fully accessible for the disabled. At this location, a pedestrian tunnel underneath the rail dam provides access to Hamburg Messe and Congress Center Hamburg (CCH). Hence the station is also known by the name Sternschanze (Messe).

Service 

The lines S11, S21 and S31 of Hamburg S-Bahn and the line U3 of Hamburg U-Bahn call at Sternschanze station.

Gallery

See also 

 Hamburger Verkehrsverbund (HVV)
 List of Hamburg S-Bahn stations
 List of Hamburg U-Bahn stations

References

External links 

 Pictures of Sternschanze Station on bilder-hamburg.info 
 Pictures of Sternschanze Station on bildarchiv-hamburg.de 

Hamburg S-Bahn stations in Hamburg
Hamburg U-Bahn stations in Hamburg
U3 (Hamburg U-Bahn) stations
Buildings and structures in Altona, Hamburg
Railway stations in Germany opened in 1866